Amigos is a 2023 Indian Telugu-language action-thriller film written and directed by Rajendra Reddy. The film features Nandamuri Kalyan Ram in a triple role as Siddharth, Manjunath Hegde, and Michael (Bipin Roy). The movie is directed by debutant Rajendra Reddy and produced by Mythri Movie Makers. Kalyan Ram plays the leading role while Ashika Ranganath, Brahmaji, Saptagiri and Kalyani Natarajan play supporting roles. 

The soundtrack is composed by Ghiban  with cinematography by Soundararajan.

Plot
The concept of doppelgangers has been around for centuries, but it has never lost its intrigue. The idea of finding someone who looks exactly like you, and perhaps even shares similar habits and characteristics, is fascinating. In the movie Amigos, the main character, Siddharth (Nandamuri Kalyan Ram), is one such person. He is obsessed with finding his look-alikes, and he eventually finds two of them through a website called "doppel.com." Manjunath Hegde, a software engineer in Bangalore, and Michael, from Kolkata. The three of them soon decide to meet in Goa.

The two men, Manjunath Hegde and Michael, all head to Goa to meet each other. As they spend time together, they become friends and embark on a series of adventures. Siddharth is a hopeless romantic and has a girlfriend, Ishika, who he loves deeply. However, he feels that his relationship with Ishika is not progressing as he wants it to, and he decides to take the help of Manjunath and Michael to make her fall in love with him. The three of them embark on a fun and comical journey to help Siddharth win the heart of his girlfriend.

However, things take a dangerous turn when Siddharth and Manjunath learn that Michael is actually the notorious arms dealer, Bipin Roy, who is most-wanted by the National Investigation Agency (NIA). Michael’s true identity comes as a shock to the two of them, and they are soon caught up in the webs of danger and lies. Michael uses his cunning ways to manipulate the situation and tries to use Siddharth and Manjunath as scapegoats to escape from the NIA.

The rest of the movie is a thrilling ride, as Siddharth and Manjunath team up to take down Michael and his evil designs. Along the way, they face many dangers and obstacles, but they are determined to stop Michael from using them as pawns in his criminal activities.

Cast 
 Nandamuri Kalyan Ram in a triple role as Siddharth, Manjunath Hegde, and Michael (Bipin Roy)
 Ashika Ranganath as Ishika, a radio personality
 Brahmaji as Siddharth's uncle
 Saptagiri
 Kalyani Natarajan as Siddharth's mother
 Jayaprakash as Siddharth's Father
 Mathew Varghese
 Pranavi Manukonda as Siddharth's sister
 Bikkina Thammiraju
 Sivannarayana as Ishika's father
 Subhashree Rayaguru

Music 
The film score and soundtrack is composed by Ghibran. Original composition for the song was done by Ilaiyaraaja.

Release

Theatrical 

Home Media 
The digital and satellite rights of the film were acquired by Netflix and Gemini TV, respectively.The film will be premiered on Netflix on 1 April 2023.

Reception

Critical response 
Amigos received mixed reviews from critics.

Sangeetha Devi Dundoo of The Hindu  wrote "Kalyan Ram does try to shoulder the proceedings, but had the writing been better, this could have been a gripping thriller drama. Ghibran’s soundtrack adds some drama but ultimately, Amigos ends up as an interesting idea that does not take off." Paul Nicodemus of The Times of India gave 3 out of 5 stars and wrote "Overall, Nandamuri Kalyan Ram’s acting prowess and presence, with a touch of action and comedy, make this action thriller work in parts. His portal of Bipin stands out. It’s not a perfect film, but it has enough to keep the viewer engaged."

Latha Srinivasan of India Today gave 2.5 out of 5 stars and wrote "At the outset, the storyline is interesting and, seeing the success of playing dual roles in Bimbisara, Kalyan Ram has gone the extra mile and played a triple role in this Amigos. Director Rajendra Reddy has tried to give all three men – Manju, Michael and Siddhu – different characterisations, but he has succeeded the most only with Michael, who has come scope for performance."

References

External links 

2023 films
2020s Telugu-language films

Mythri Movie Makers films
Films shot in Hyderabad, India
Films shot in Goa
Films shot in Bangalore
Films shot in Kolkata
Indian action thriller films
2023 action thriller films